Jeremy Vargas Sagastegui (November 1, 1970 – October 13, 1998) was an American killer convicted of three counts of aggravated first-degree murder for the drowning and beating of Kievan Sarbacher, 3, and the shooting deaths of his mother, Melissa Sarbacher, 21, and a second woman, Lisa Vera-Acevedo, 27.

The killings occurred on November 19, 1995, in a mobile home in rural Finley, Washington, located east of Kennewick, where Sagastegui had been babysitting Sarbacher's two children. The second child, a 1-year-old girl, was unharmed.

Sometime between the evening hours of November 18 and the early morning hours of November 19, at a residence in Finley, Jeremy Sagastegui sexually abused, beat, stabbed, and then drowned Kievan Sarbacher, a three-year-old boy who was in his care. Sagastegui then waited for Kievan's mother, Melissa Sarbacher, to return home. When she did so, he shot her and her friend, Lisa Vera-Acevedo, who had accompanied Sarbacher home.

The convicted triple murderer refused to fight his execution. His mother filed for a stay on his behalf but it was denied as Sagastegui was found competent, and therefore no third party, including his mother, could file on his behalf.

He was executed on October 13, 1998 by lethal injection aged 27.

See also
 Capital punishment in Washington (state)
 Capital punishment in the United States
 List of people executed in Washington

General references
 135 Wn.2d 67, STATE v. SAGASTEGUI No. 63744-0. En Banc.. Retrieved on 2007-11-10.
 Persons Executed Since 1904 in Washington State. Washington State Department of Corrections. Retrieved on 2019-01-12.
 State Supreme Court Denies Motion to Delay Sagastegui Execution. Washington State Office of the Attorney General (1998-10-01). Retrieved on 2007-11-10.
 Jason Hagey. . Tri-City Herald (1998-08-18). Archived from the original on 1999-04-18. Retrieved on 2007-11-10.

1970 births
1998 deaths
20th-century executions of American people
American murderers of children
American people executed for murder
20th-century executions by Washington (state)
People executed by Washington (state) by lethal injection
People convicted of murder by Washington (state)